Sri Shanmuga Hindu Ladies College (also known as Trincomalee Ladies College or Trinco Ladies College) is a national school in Trincomalee, Sri Lanka.

History
The school was founded on 20 October 1923 by Thangamma Shanmugampillai in memory of her husband Sittampalam Shanmugampillai.

See also
 List of schools in Eastern Province, Sri Lanka

References

1923 establishments in Ceylon
Educational institutions established in 1923
National schools in Sri Lanka
Schools in Trincomalee